Piero Brumana (30 July 1901 – 17 December 1975) was an Italian racing cyclist. He rode in the 1926 Tour de France.

References

1901 births
1975 deaths
Italian male cyclists
Place of birth missing